This is a list of the 129 members of the 48th Parliament of Haiti, elected in the 2006 election.

Senate

Delegation from Artibonite Department

Delegation from Centre Department

Delegation from Grand'Anse Department

Delegation from Nippes Department

Delegation from Nord Department

Delegation from Nord-Est Department

Delegation from Nord-Ouest Department

Delegation from Ouest Department

Delegation from Sud Department

Delegation from Sud-Est Department

Chamber of Deputies

Delegation from Artibonite Department

Delegation from Centre Department

Delegation from Grand'Anse Department

Delegation from Nippes Department

Delegation from Nord Department

Delegation from Nord-Est Department

Delegation from Nord-Ouest Department

Delegation from Ouest Department

Delegation from Sud Department

Delegation from Sud-Est Department

External links
Source of data for both senate and chamber of Deputies

Haiti
 2006-2010
Parliament